Fox Sleuth is an Australian subscription television channel which focuses on airing crime TV series. The channel launched on 31 December 2019, replacing the Australian feed of 13th Street.

Current Programs
 Agatha Christie's Marple
 Agatha Christie’s Poirot
 Blue Murder
 The Brokenwood Mysteries
 Columbo
 Endeavour
 Frankie Drake Mysteries
 Inspector George Gently
 Heartbeat
 Inspector George Gently
 The Inspector Lynley Mysteries
 Inspector Morse
 Jonathan Creek
 Line of Duty
 Magnum, P.I.
 Murder, She Wrote
 Murdoch Mysteries
 Prime Suspect
 Rosemary & Thyme
 Scott & Bailey
 Silent Witness
 A Touch of Frost
 Vera
 Waking the Dead
 Wire in the Blood

References

External links
 Foxtel Website

2019 establishments in Australia
English-language television stations in Australia
Television networks in Australia
Television channels and stations established in 2019
Foxtel
Crime television networks